Lauri Haapanen (10 September 1889 – 24 April 1947) was a Finnish wrestler. He competed in the featherweight event at the 1912 Summer Olympics.

References

External links
 

1889 births
1947 deaths
People from Ylöjärvi
People from Turku and Pori Province (Grand Duchy of Finland)
Olympic wrestlers of Finland
Wrestlers at the 1912 Summer Olympics
Finnish male sport wrestlers
Sportspeople from Pirkanmaa